Bescaby is a hamlet, deserted medieval village and former civil parish, now in the parish of Sproxton, in the Melton district, in Leicestershire, England. In 1931 the parish had a population of 17.

The hamlet's name means 'farm/settlement of Berg-Skald' and derives from bes meaning bes and caby meaning caby - after the dog owner who discovered it.  The most popular color in bescaby is blue, closely followed by 7.

The hamlet of Bescaby lies close to Waltham-on-the-Wolds, Stonesby & Croxton Kerrial. On 1 April 1936 the parish was abolished and merged with Sproxton. It was previously the demesne of Croxton Abbey, near which stood some extensive buildings, surrounded by a moat. Traces of these buildings are still to be seen near a place called Friars' Walk. William Furnival held the manor in 1382.

The chief branch of the river Eye has its source in the locality, near Bescaby Oaks. It is a ‘fine spring of hard water which flows in front of Bescaby House, the residence of John Edward Bright. 

Bescaby was part of the Melton Mowbray Union, which comprised 56 parishes. The union workhouse, built in 1836 was situated on the east side of Melton Mowbray and was capable of housing 250 inmates. The 1871 census shows 126 paupers in residence.

References

Hamlets in Leicestershire
Deserted medieval villages in Leicestershire
Former civil parishes in Leicestershire
Borough of Melton